Bellaleenan is a townland in the civil parish of Templeport, County Cavan, Ireland. It lies in the Roman Catholic parish of Templeport and barony of Tullyhaw.

Geography
Bellaleenan is bounded on the north by Culliagh and Torrewa townlands in Corlough parish, on the west by Drumlaydan townland in Corlough parish, on the south by Sraloaghan, County Leitrim and Ballymagirril townlands and on the east by Stranadarragh and Drumlougher townlands. Its chief geographical features are the River Blackwater, County Cavan, forestry plantations and dug wells. Bellaleenan is traversed by minor roads and rural lanes. The townland covers 222 statute acres.

History

In medieval times the McGovern barony of Tullyhaw was divided into economic taxation areas called ballibetoes, from the Irish Baile Biataigh (Anglicized as 'Ballybetagh'), meaning 'A Provisioner's Town or Settlement'. The original purpose was to enable the farmer, who controlled the baile, to provide hospitality for those who needed it, such as poor people and travellers. The ballybetagh was further divided into townlands farmed by individual families who paid a tribute or tax to the head of the ballybetagh, who in turn paid a similar tribute to the clan chief. The steward of the ballybetagh would have been the secular equivalent of the erenagh in charge of church lands. There were seven ballibetoes in the parish of Templeport. Bellaleenan was located in the ballybetagh of Ballymackgonghan (Irish = Baile Mac Eochagain, meaning 'McEoghan's Town').

The 1609 Baronial Map depicts the townland as part of the four polls of BMcGoagh (an abbreviation of Ballemagoechan).

In the Plantation of Ulster by grant dated 13 March 1610, King James VI and I granted four polls of Ballemagoechan to Cahell M'Owen O Reyly. The four polls consisted of 1 in Bealaghlyan, 2 in Acoylagh (modern day townland of Culliagh) and 1 in Cronarry (modern day townland of Cronery), totalling 200 acres. The said Cathal O'Reilly was the nephew of two chiefs of the O'Reilly clan- Aodh Connallach mac Maolmhordha who was chief from 1565–1583 and Eamonn mac Maolmhordha who was chief from 1596–1601. He was also a brother of Cathaoir O'Reilly who received lands in Kildoagh townland and first cousin of Donill Backagh McShane O'Reyly who was simultaneously granted lands in Burren (townland).

An Inquisition of King Charles I of England held in Cavan Town on 31 March 1635 stated that Cahell O Reily was seized in his lifetime of, inter alia, one poll of Bealaghlynan. He died 1 January 1634 and his son Hugh O'Reily had reached his majority and was married.

The O'Reilly lands in Bellaleenan were confiscated in the Cromwellian Act for the Settlement of Ireland 1652 and were distributed as follows-

In the Hearth Money Rolls compiled on 29 September 1663 there was one person paying the Hearth Tax in Ballylenan- Phelemy McKelagher

The 1652 Commonwealth Survey lists the townland (spelled Balleleanan) as belonging to Lieutenant-Colonel Tristam Beresford and a further confirming grant dated 3 November 1666 was made by King Charles II of England to the aforementioned Sir Tristram Beresford, 1st Baronet which included, inter alia, 96 acres-2 roods-32 perches of land in Gortnegloigh or Gorteengloigh alias Ballymagough or Ballynegough. By grant dated 11 September 1670 from King Charles II of England to said Sir Tristram Beresford, the said lands of Gortnegleigh or Ballymagough were included in the creation of a new Manor of Beresford.

On 10 April 1716, Marcus Beresford, 1st Earl of Tyrone the son of the aforesaid Sir Tristram Beresford, granted a lease for lives of certain lands, including Ballylenan, to James Kirkwood of Owen Gally (Owengallees). In a marriage settlement made 18 Oct 1718 with his wife Katherine (née Lowther), the said James Kirkwood settled the lands, including Ballilenam, on his children. Katherine Lowther's sister-in-law, Jane Lowther (née Beresford), was the daughter of the aforesaid Sir Tristram Beresford, which is probably how the lease came about. James Kirkwood was son of Reverend James Kirkwood, Chaplain to King William III of England, Prebendary of Kilskeery and Rector of Magheracross parishes in County Fermanagh from 1693.

The 1790 Cavan Carvaghs list spells the townland name as Bellalinan.

Lowther Kirkwood of Mullinagrave, parish of Templeport, Co. Cavan, gentleman made the following will-

The Tithe Applotment Books for 1827 list eighteen tithepayers in the townland.

The Bellaleenan Valuation Office Field books are available for October 1839.

Griffith's Valuation of 1857 lists thirteen landholders in the townland.

On 6 July 1857 the Incumbered Estates Commission published the following notice

In the Matter of the Estate of James Brien, Geo. Brien, Edward Brien and Francis Brien, Owners. Exparte by Isabella Crummer, Petitioner. The commissioners having ordered a Sale of the Lands of Shanadaragh and Curnagunlogh, Cullegh, Drumlohgher, Drumledin, Sananaragh, and Drumledin, and Corlough, situate in the Barony of Tullyhaw, and County of Cavan, held under lease dated the 10th April, 1718, from the Bishop Raphoe, for lives renewable for ever, and which Lands are included in the denominations of Ballymagord, Owngally, Gortneglough, Drumedin or 'Ballylennin , in said lease mentioned:

Census

In the 1901 census of Ireland, there are ten families listed in the townland
 and in the 1911 census of Ireland, there are thirteen families listed in the townland.

Antiquities
The only structure of historical interest in the townland seems to be Saint Patrick's Well, where a pattern was held on the first Sunday in July up to the 1950s, to mark the festival of Lughnasadh.

References

External links
The IreAtlas Townland Data Base

Townlands of County Cavan